Euthystira brachyptera, the Small Gold Grasshopper, is a species of grasshopper belonging to the family Acrididae.

Subspecies
 Euthystira brachyptera brachyptera (Ocskay, 1826) 
 Euthystira brachyptera intermedia (Bolivar, I., 1897)

Description
The body color is shiny yellow-green. The wings of the males reach the center of the abdomen, while the wings of the females are very small and usually purplish. This species could be confused with Euchorthippus declivus and Chrysochraon dispar. It can be distinguished by means of the sharper top of head and the proportionally smaller eyes. Adults can be found from July to September.

Distribution and habitat
This species is present in most of Europe, in the eastern Palearctic realm, and in the Near East. It prefers mountain and subalpine meadows with tall grasses, heaths with rough vegetation and woodland clearings. It is quite common in calcareous grasslands with Brachypodium pinnatum.

References 

Gomphocerinae
Orthoptera of Europe
Taxa named by Franz Ocskay